The 2019 Gulf Coast Premier League season was the 4th season of the GCPL. FC New Orleans won the playoffs after beating Northshore United in the final.

Team Changes

Incoming teams

Outgoing teams

Standings

West Division

Central Division

East Division

Playoffs 

Note: FC New Orleans and Northshore United entered at the semi-finals stage.

Statistics

Top Scorers

Top Assists

References

Gulf Coast Premier League